Marinna may refer to:

Myrina (Aeolis), present-day Turkey
Marinna, New South Wales, Australia
 Marinna Teal or Strings (born 1975), American rapper and songwriter

See also
 Marina (disambiguation)